Tofaş Nilüfer Spor Salonu, or Tofaş Nilüfer Sports Hall, is a multi-purpose indoor arena that is located in Nilüfer, Bursa, Turkey. The arena has a seating capacity of 7,500 people for basketball games.

History
Tofaş Nilüfer Spor Salonu was opened on 19 March 2014. The arena has been used as the home arena of the professional basketball clubs, Tofaş Bursa and Bursaspor, of the Turkish Super League (BSL).

References

External links
Tofaş Spor Salonu at Tofaş Bursa's official website
Image of Tofaş Nilüfer Spor Salonu's Exterior
Image of Tofaş Nilüfer Spor Salonu's Interior

Basketball venues in Turkey
Buildings and structures in Bursa
Indoor arenas in Turkey
Sports venues completed in 2014
Turkish Basketball League venues